The 2013–14 Newcastle Jets FC season is the club's 13th season since its foundation in 2000. The club participated in the A-League for the 9th time.

Players

Squad

Transfers

Winter

In

Out

Summer

In

Out

Pre-season and friendlies

Competitions

Overall

A-League

League table

Results summary

Results by round

Matches

National Youth League

League table

Results summary

Results by round

Matches

League Goalscorers per Round

National Premier League

Results summary

Results by round

Matches

League Goalscorers per Round

Squad statistics

Appearances and goals

League Goalscorers per Round

Disciplinary record

Awards
 Male U20 Footballer of the Year – Joshua Brillante
 Player of the Week (Round 6) – Adam Taggart
 Player of the Week (Round 7) – Adam Taggart
 NAB Young Footballer of the Month (November) – Adam Taggart
 NAB Young Footballer of the Month (February) – Joshua Brillante

References

Newcastle Jets FC seasons
Newcastle Jets